2-oxoglutarate/L-arginine monooxygenase/decarboxylase (succinate-forming) (ethylene-forming enzyme, EFE) is an enzyme with systematic name L-arginine,2-oxoglutarate:oxygen oxidoreductase (succinate-forming). This enzyme catalyses the following chemical reaction

 2-oxoglutarate + L-arginine + O2  succinate + CO2 + guanidine + (S)-1-pyrroline-5-carboxylate + H2O (overall reaction)
(1a) 2-oxoglutarate + L-arginine + O2  succinate + CO2 + L-hydroxyarginine
(1b) L-hydroxyarginine  guanidine + (S)-1-pyrroline-5-carboxylate + H2O

2-oxoglutarate/L-arginine monooxygenase/decarboxylase catalyses two cycles of the ethylene-forming reaction.

References

External links 

EC 1.14.11